Valenki (sg valenok) are traditional Russian winter footwear, essentially felt boots: the name valenok literally means "made by felting". They are not water-resistant, and are often worn with galoshes to  protect the soles from wear and moisture.

Description

Valenki are usually worn for walking on dry snow in frosty weather. In order to prevent wear, the boots are often soled with leather, rubber or another durable material or worn with galoshes. Traditionally, valenki come in brown, black, gray and white, however, modern versions are often dyed or produced from colored artificial materials.

The use of felted footwear has been known for millennia, felt shoes have been found in Iron Age Siberian burials. The origin of valenki has been speculated to trace back to the traditional felt boots worn by nomads of the Great Steppe (including Southern Rus'). The first modern valenki appeared in the early eighteenth century and became more widespread as Russian industrialization progressed, becoming cheaper and more accessible.

Before the Russian Revolution, the production of valenki was concentrated in the Semenov district of Nizhny Novgorod province, in the Kineshma District of Kostroma province, and in the Kukmor in Kazan province. In 1900, contemporary jackboot fulling factories of Russia produced 1.4 million pairs of valenki for the value of 2.1 million rubles. In 1900, a pair of valenki cost 1.5 rubles, in 1912 - 2 rubles, at the end of 1916 the speculative price reached up to 12-18 rubles per pair.

Valenki have become less popular in urban life since the middle of the twentieth century, as human activity has softened the winters in cities, requiring lighter and more waterproof footwear. In modern media, valenki are seen as a rustic, old-fashioned style of clothing; in cities they are usually worn by small children, or during especially severe frost. Valenki are included in the standard equipment of parts of the internal military service of the Russian army.

See also
 Telogreika
 Ushanka
 Afghanka

References

Sources 
 Békési, László (2006) Stalin's War: Soviet uniforms and militaria 1941-45. Ramsbury: The Crowood Press 
Zaloga, Steven J. (1989) The Red Army of the Great Patriotic War, 1941-45. London: Osprey

External links 

18th-century fashion
19th-century fashion
20th-century fashion
Boots
Folk footwear
Russian folk clothing
Russian inventions
Winter clothes